Tazhong (Pinyin tǎ zhōng zhèn) is a town in Qiemo County, Bayingolin Mongol Autonomous Prefecture, Xinjiang. Tazhong administers one community: Tazhong Community. Tazhong was created on July 24, 2015.

Geography 
Tazhong is located in the Taklamakan Desert.

Climate

Economy 
The petroleum industry makes up most of the economy of Tazhong. There are more than 100 oilfield units and engineering construction units such as PetroChina Tarim Oilfield Branch, Sinopec Northwest Oilfield Branch, Daqing Oilfield Tadong Company, and nearly 100 various commercial outlets in the area of Tazhong. Other than petroleum, the service and tourism industry also support Tazhong.

Transport 
Tarim Desert Highway runs through Tazhong.

References 

Township-level divisions of Xinjiang
Qiemo County